Louis Heilprin Pollak (December 7, 1922 – May 8, 2012) was a United States district judge of the United States District Court for the Eastern District of Pennsylvania. He served on the faculty of Yale Law School and was dean from 1965 to 1970, served on the faculty of the University of Pennsylvania Law School and was dean from 1974 to 1978.

Education and career

Born in New York City, New York, Pollak received his Bachelor of Arts degree magna cum laude from Harvard University in 1943 and his Bachelor of Laws from the Yale Law School in 1948, where he was editor of the Yale Law Journal. After completing his undergraduate studies at Harvard, Pollak entered the United States Army in 1943, during World War II, serving until 1946. The war ended before he would be deployed outside of the United States. Pollak served as a law clerk to Justice Wiley Rutledge of the United States Supreme Court following graduation from law school. After completing his clerkship, from 1949 to 1951, Pollak worked at the law firm now known as Paul, Weiss, Rifkind, Wharton & Garrison. He then served in the United States Department of State as special assistant to Ambassador-at-large Philip C. Jessup until 1953. Thereafter, Pollak worked as assistant counsel for the Amalgamated Clothing Workers of America. In 1955, Pollak joined the faculty of Yale Law School, where he would remain until 1974. He served as dean from 1965 to 1970. 

In 1974, he moved to the University of Pennsylvania Law School, becoming dean the following year. In 1978, he left the University when he was appointed to the bench. Until his death, Pollak remained an adjunct member of the Penn Law faculty and taught there regularly.

Other legal service

Beginning in 1950, Pollak provided assistance to the NAACP Legal Defense Fund. He worked actively on Brown v. Board of Education. Because he was then working for the State Department, he was not listed on the briefs in the Supreme Court.

Federal judicial service

Pollak was nominated by President Jimmy Carter on June 7, 1978, to a seat on the United States District Court for the Eastern District of Pennsylvania vacated by Judge A. Leon Higginbotham Jr. He was confirmed by the United States Senate on July 10, 1978, and received his commission on July 12, 1978. He assumed senior status on January 1, 1991, serving in that status until his death on May 8, 2012, in the West Mount Airy neighborhood of Philadelphia, Pennsylvania.

Personal

Pollak's father, Walter H. Pollak, was also a well-known lawyer. He is now remembered especially for his work in major civil rights cases, including Gitlow v. New York and representation of the Scottsboro Boys. From 1952, Pollak was married to Katherine Weiss Pollak, the daughter of Louis S. Weiss, a founding partner of the Paul, Weiss law firm. They had five daughters and eight grandchildren.

See also 
 List of law clerks of the Supreme Court of the United States (Seat 3)

References

External links

 Louis H. Pollak papers (MS 1989). Manuscripts and Archives, Yale University Library.

 

1922 births
2012 deaths
20th-century American judges
Deans of University of Pennsylvania Law School
Deans of Yale Law School
Harvard University alumni
Judges of the United States District Court for the Eastern District of Pennsylvania
Law clerks of the Supreme Court of the United States
Paul, Weiss, Rifkind, Wharton & Garrison people
United States Army personnel of World War II
United States district court judges appointed by Jimmy Carter
University of Pennsylvania Law School faculty
Yale Law School alumni
Yale Law School faculty